Spilarctia ardens is a moth in the family Erebidae. It was described by Yasunori Kishida in 1987. It is found on Luzon in the Philippines.

References

Moths described in 1987
ardens